O'Hare Transfer is a commuter railroad station along Metra's North Central Service that serves Chicago's O'Hare International Airport. As of 2018, O'Hare Transfer is the 183rd busiest of Metra's 236 non-downtown stations, with an average of 113 weekday boardings. The station is located at the dead end of Zemke Boulevard east of Mannheim Road (US 12/US 45) outside the northeast corner of the airport's Multi-Modal Facility (rental car/parking lot).

The railroad station is connected to the Airport Transit System people mover at the O'Hare Multimodal Facility. Two Pace bus routes also stop curbside at the lower level of the ATS station. The free ride on the people mover provides a connection to all four of the airline terminals.

As of December 12, 2022, O'Hare Transfer is served by 12 trains (six in each direction) on weekdays.

Owing to the weekday only operation and limited frequency offered by the North Central Service, the station is not currently a significant means of access for travelers to O'Hare. All trains are scheduled to stop at the inside (westernmost) platform, but occasionally an announcement will be made over the public address system that a train will be stopping on the outside (easternmost) platform.

References

External links

Station House from Google Maps Street View

Metra stations in Illinois
Airport railway stations in the United States
Railway stations in the United States opened in 1996
O'Hare International Airport
Railway stations in Chicago